Three Steps North is a 1951 Italian–American film noir crime film directed by W. Lee Wilder and starring Lloyd Bridges, Lea Padovani and Aldo Fabrizi. The film is also known as Tre passi a nord in Italy.

Plot
Dishonorably discharged after a four-year stint in a military prison for dabbling in black markets while stationed in Italy during World War II, former US soldier Frank Keeler (Lloyd Bridges) wants to discreetly recover a stash of money he buried near Amalfi prior to his arrest. However this turns out to be more difficult than expected when the police becomes interested in him and starts tailing him, while local shady characters guess the purpose of his presence.

Cast
 Lloyd Bridges as Frank Keeler
 Lea Padovani as Elena Ravezza
 Aldo Fabrizi as Pietro
 William Tubbs as Jack Convay
 Dino Galvani as Massina
 Adriano Ambrogi as Baldori
 Gianni Rizzo as The Greek
 Peggy Doro as Mrs. Day
 Adam Genette as Policeman Falzone

Reception
Film critic Bosley Crowther found nothing in the film that interested him, writing, "But all of the tedious maneuvering that Mr. Bridges does to recover his buried treasure, on which other criminals seem to have designs, is grimly routine and unexciting, and the pay-off, which clears up everything, is one of those fatuous fast shuffles that is acceptable only to our prim Production Code."

See also
 List of films in the public domain in the United States

References

External links
 
 
 
 
 
 Three Steps North information site and DVD review at DVD Beaver (includes images)

1951 films
1951 drama films
American black-and-white films
English-language Italian films
Film noir
1950s Italian-language films
Italian black-and-white films
Italian crime drama films
American crime drama films
Films directed by W. Lee Wilder
United Artists films
1950s American films
1950s Italian films